Atmospheric icing occurs in the atmosphere when water droplets suspended in air freeze on objects they come in contact with. It is not the same as freezing rain, which is caused directly by precipitation. Icing conditions can be particularly dangerous to aircraft, as the built-up ice changes the aerodynamics of the flight surfaces and airframe, which can increase the risk of a stall and potentially accidents. For this reason, on-board ice protection systems have been developed on aircraft intended to fly through these conditions.

Water that persists in liquid state below this temperature is said to be supercooled, and supercooled water droplets cause icing on aircraft. Below , icing is rare because clouds at these temperatures usually consist of ice particles rather than supercooled water droplets. Below , supercooled water always freezes; therefore, icing is impossible.

Icing also occurs on towers, wind turbines, boats, oil rigs, trees and other objects exposed to sub-freezing temperatures and water droplets. Unmanned aircraft are particularly sensitive to icing.  In cold climates on land, atmospheric icing can be common in winter as elevated terrain interacts with cold clouds as these can freeze en masses on mountain slopes. Ice loads are a major cause of catastrophic failures of overhead electric power lines when icing accumulates and breaks them from shear weight. Their estimation is, therefore, crucial in the structural design of power line systems to withstand ice loads and can be done by numerical icing models and examples that include meteorological data.

See also

 Condensation
 Frost
 Hard rime
 Soft rime
 Icing (nautical)

References

Sources
 FAA (U.S.) Advisory Circular 20-113: Pilot Precautions and Procedures to be taken in Preventing Aircraft Reciprocating Engine Induction System and Fuel System Icing Problems
 FAA (U.S.) Advisory Circular 20-117: Hazards Following Ground Deicing and Ground Operations in Conditions Conducive to Aircraft Icing
 FAA (U.S.) Advisory Circular 20-147: Turbojet, Turboprop, and Turbofan Engine Induction System Icing and Ice Ingestion
 Wind Energy in Cold Climates: Icing on wind turbines

External links

Airline Regulators Grapple With Engine-Shutdown Peril WSJ April 7, 2008
   Supercooled liquid water and airframe icing

Precipitation